Fred Duval Ngoma (born 24 November 1997) is a Republic of the Congo football midfielder for CA Bizertin.

References

1997 births
Living people
Republic of the Congo footballers
Republic of the Congo international footballers
CSMD Diables Noirs players
AC Léopards players
CS La Mancha players
AS Otôho players
Association football midfielders